Pleasance is a surname. Notable people with the surname include:

 Richard Pleasance (21st century), Australian musician and record producer
 Simon Pleasance (born 1944), Anglo-French art translator and writer

See also
 Pleasence, another surname